Räägi is a village in Saaremaa Parish, Saare County in western Estonia.

Before the administrative reform in 2017, the village was in Leisi Parish.

Architect Mai Šein (born 1946) was born in Räägi village.

References

Villages in Saare County